Philip Kiaran McGinley (born 6 June 1981) is an English actor, best known for playing Anguy the Archer in Season 3 of HBO's Game of Thrones.

Early life
He was born in Liverpool and grew up in Golborne, near Wigan. He attended All Saints Primary School, Golborne High School, Winstanley Sixth Form College, the Oxford School of Drama, and the Arts Educational Schools in London, graduating in 2003. Philip attended Willpower Youth Theatre in Wigan for many years until he left to go to drama school.

Selected stage and screen credits

Theatre
 The Changeling with Cheek by Jowl, directed by Declan Donnellan
Great Expectations with the Royal Shakespeare Company
 Kes with the Royal Exchange, Manchester.
 Young Tom in Canary at the Liverpool Playhouse
 Waldorf in Straight at the Studio Theatre (Sheffield)
 Jesus in the York Mystery Plays 2016

Television
BBC – Dalziel and Pascoe, The Deputy, Hawking, Father Brown; Battlefield Britain, Casualty, and The Gemma Factor
ITV – Coronation Street, Cold Blood, Blue Murder, Falling, Heartbeat, Vera, The Bill and This Morning (Self)
Channel 4 - Mark in Drifters,  Bob Simmons in No Offence
 HBO – Anguy in Game of Thrones

References

External links 

1981 births
Living people
People from Golborne
Male actors from Liverpool
English male stage actors
English male television actors